Timeline of the Turks may refer to:

Timeline of the Turks (500–1300) a general chronology between 500 and 1300
Uyghur timeline a detailed timeline up to 763 (excludes most of Uyghur Khaganate)
Timeline of the Sultanate of Rûm exclusively about Anatolia and vicinity between 1071 and 1302
Timeline of Turkish history from 1299